In music, an approach chord (also chromatic approach chord and dominant approach chord) is a chord one half-step higher or lower than the goal, especially in the context of turnarounds and cycle-of-fourths progressions, for example the two bar 50s progression:

 |G /  Em /   |Am /   D7 /   ||
may be filled in with approach chords:
 |G F9 Em Abm |Am D#7 D7 Gb7 ||
F9 being the half-step to Em, Am being the half-step to Am, D7 being the half-step to D7, and G7 being the half-step to G. G being I, Em being vi, Am being ii, and D7 being V7 (see ii-V-I turnaround and circle progression).

An approach chord may also be the chord immediately preceding the target chord such as the subdominant (FMaj7) preceding the tonic (CMaj7) creating a strong cadence through the contrast of no more than two common tones: FACE – CEGB.

Approach chords may thus be a semitone or a fifth or fourth from their target.

Approach chords create the harmonic space of the modes in jazz rather than secondary dominants.

See also
Passing chord
Predominant chord
Tritone substitution

References

Further reading
 R., Ken (2012). DOG EAR Tritone Substitution for Jazz Guitar, Amazon Digital Services, Inc., ASIN: B008FRWNIW

Chords